Le National is a 30-minute French newscast hosted by Geneviève Asselin, airing weekdays at 10:30pm ET on RDI. It focuses on news stories from across Canada, with most stories sourced from the local editions of Le Téléjournal airing across the country on Radio-Canada affiliates.

Although the title is similar to CBC's English-language flagship newscast The National, Radio-Canada's flagship is in fact the late-evening network edition of Le Téléjournal, which airs at 9:00 p.m. ET on RDI, and 10:00 p.m. local / 11:00 AT on Radio-Canada.

2010s Canadian television news shows
CBC News
2020s Canadian television news shows